Road Forks is an unincorporated community in western Hidalgo County, New Mexico, United States, in the southwestern corner of the state. Road Forks had a post office from shortly after its founding in 1925 until 1955, when postal services were transferred to Lordsburg.

History
Road Forks was founded in 1925 by Mr. and Mrs. G. H. Porter, who gave it its name.

Notes

Populated places established in 1925
Unincorporated communities in New Mexico
Unincorporated communities in Hidalgo County, New Mexico
1925 establishments in New Mexico